Roads in Finland comprise  of highways, paved and gravel roads which are divided in four to five classes according to their local importance.

Classification of public roads 

The classification and numbering system of state-maintained roads of Finland is as follows:
Main roads Class I: 1–39 (between major cities) 
Main roads Class II: 40–99  (between regional centers) 
Regional roads: 100–999 (between large municipalities or alternate routes) 
Connecting roads: 1000–9999 (connecting to a larger road) 
Local roads: 11000–19999 (between villages cf. farm-to-market road)
Streets are maintained by the local municipality. Winter maintenance of roads and streets is managed by a local authority. Regional roads and connecting roads cf. county highways and roads. Main roads cf. Interstates or U.S. routes. 

All main roads and almost all regional roads are paved. About half of the connecting and local roads are paved. Connecting and local roads are usually not marked with numbers, but just with ordinary traffic signs.

Highways

The main highways are all paved and have at least two lanes; they are better maintained than main and regional roads. Highways numbered from 1 to 7 radiate from the capital Helsinki (Highways 2, 5 and 6 diverge from 1, 4 and 7, respectively), while highways 8 to 10 radiate from Turku on the south-western coast of Finland. Highways 11 and 12 originate in Tampere. The rest of the highways start from other major cities.

Sections of highway between major cities have often been upgraded to motorways, for example between Helsinki and Tampere. Since Finland is a large and sparsely populated country, there is no need to upgrade all highways to motorways.

Other roads
Many private roads may be used by the general public, and may have different speed limits and different regulations from public roads. These are usually dead ends in the countryside. Private roads are maintained by the community using them. They may not be eligible for communal subsidies. Some of these are not public rights of way, which is usually indicated by a sign. Forest roads are not regularly maintained, nor addressed for emergency services. Private ice roads are also sometimes built by the inhabitants of lakeland and archipelago.

Controversies

Price cartel
Lemminkäinen and seven smaller companies were convicted of forming a price cartel to overcharge local authorities millions of euros for road paving work (asphalt). In 1999 the Supreme Administrative Court of Finland ruled that the companies colluded on prices and other matters at least between 1994 and 2002. In November 2013 the Helsinki District Court ordered the companies to pay the largest damages in Finnish legal history: 40m euros to forty Finnish municipalities.

References

External links 

 Finnish Transport Agency
 Finnish Road Administration
 Introduction to Roads in Finland by Matti Grönroos